Inchausti is a Basque surname, from the Basque region of Spain. Notable people with the surname include:

Mario Inchausti (1915−2006), Cuban footballer
José Ignacio Inchausti (1973−), Spanish footballer
Ruperto Inchausti (1918−2013), Bolivian footballer

Basque-language surnames